Petro Danilovich Sardachuk (11 July 1938 – 21 January 2022) was a Ukrainian diplomat. He served as ambassador to Slovakia, Poland, Finland, and Iceland. He died on 21 January 2022, at the age of 83.

References

1938 births
2022 deaths
Ambassadors of Ukraine to Finland
Ambassadors of Ukraine to Iceland
Ambassadors of Ukraine to Poland
Ambassadors of Ukraine to Slovakia
Recipients of the Order of Friendship of Peoples
Recipients of the Order of Merit (Ukraine), 3rd class
University of Lviv alumni
Diplomatic Academy of the Ministry of Foreign Affairs of the Russian Federation alumni
People from Wołyń Voivodeship (1921–1939)